Siniša Stanković (26 March 1892 – 24 February 1974) was a Yugoslav and Serbian scientist and politician. As a prominent biologist, he became member of the Serbian Academy of Sciences and Arts. As a politician and statesman, from 1944 to 1946, he was the most senior state official of Serbia, then a federated state within Yugoslavia, and thus considered as the 1st President of Serbia as the President of the Presidium of the People's Assembly of Serbia.

Biography
He served as President of the Presidency of the Anti-fascist Assembly for the National Liberation of Serbia (ASNOS), from November 1944 to April 1945, and then as President of the Presidency of the People's Assembly of Serbia, from April 1945 to November 1946. During that period, he was the most senior official of Serbia, and thus considered as the 1st President of Serbia. 

Stanković was born in Zajecar, Kingdom of Serbia and died in Belgrade, SFR Yugoslavia. He graduated from the University of Belgrade and Grenoble University. As a prominent biologist, he became member of the Serbian Academy of Sciences and Arts. He was founder of Institute for ecology and biogeography, and director of the Biological Institute of Serbia. He had a long career in the Serbian and Yugoslav communist parties. During the Second World War he was member of communist Partisan movement. 

One species of pseudoscorpion is named after him as (lat. neobisium stankovici).

Selected works
Living space, critic of racism and nazism
The framework of life
Lake Ohrid and its living world

See also
 Socialist Republic of Serbia
 Democratic Federal Yugoslavia
 Cabinet of Blagoje Nešković

References

1892 births
1974 deaths
People from Zaječar
Serbian biologists
Members of the Serbian Academy of Sciences and Arts
Presidents of Serbia within Yugoslavia
League of Communists of Serbia politicians